Raun Johnson (born 1991) is a Guyanese cricketer. He played in two first-class matches for Guyana in 2014.

See also
 List of Guyanese representative cricketers

References

External links
 

1991 births
Living people
Guyanese cricketers
Guyana cricketers